Charles Dewey Day,  (May 6, 1806 – January 31, 1884) was a lawyer, judge and political figure in Canada East.

Life and career
He was born in Bennington, Vermont in 1806 and came to Montreal in Lower Canada with his family in 1812. The family moved again to Hull in 1828. Charles studied in Montreal, articled in law and was called to the bar in 1827. He practised mainly in the Ottawa valley and represented lumber merchants such as the Wright family. In 1838, he was named Queen's Counsel.

He spoke publicly against Papineau's Ninety-Two Resolutions in 1834. In 1840, he was appointed solicitor general in the Special Council that administered Lower Canada up until the union of the two Canadas in 1841. In 1841, he was elected to represent the Canada East constituency of Ottawa in the Legislative Assembly of the Province of Canada. During his time in the Assembly, he worked to improve education in the province. He was named solicitor general in the Executive Council for the province; Robert Baldwin and other Reformers opposed Day's appointment. In 1842, he resigned to accept an appointment to the Court of Queen's Bench. In 1850, he was appointed to the Superior Court.

From 1852 to 1884, he served as president of the Royal Institution for the Advancement of Learning in the province. From 1859 to 1865, he helped develop the Civil Code for Lower Canada. From 1864 to 1884, he served as chancellor of McGill University and helped establish the McGill University Faculty of Law there. In 1868, he represented Quebec when the assets and liabilities of Upper and Lower Canada were divided after Confederation. In 1873, he investigated charges of corruption against the government in the Pacific Scandal.

He died during a visit to England in 1884.

References 
 

1806 births
1884 deaths
People from Bennington, Vermont
Canadian King's Counsel
Canadian Anglicans
Canadian judges
Chancellors of McGill University
Members of the Legislative Assembly of the Province of Canada from Canada East
Members of the Special Council of Lower Canada
Principals of McGill University
American emigrants to pre-Confederation Quebec
Province of Canada judges
Immigrants to Lower Canada
19th-century Canadian judges